Beta blockers, also spelled β-blockers, are a class of medications that are predominantly used to manage abnormal heart rhythms, and to protect the heart from a second heart attack after a first heart attack (secondary prevention). They are also widely used to treat high blood pressure, although they are no longer the first choice for initial treatment of most patients.

Beta blockers are competitive antagonists that block the receptor sites for the endogenous catecholamines epinephrine (adrenaline) and norepinephrine (noradrenaline) on adrenergic beta receptors, of the sympathetic nervous system, which mediates the fight-or-flight response. Some block activation of all types of β-adrenergic receptors and others are selective for one of the three known types of beta receptors, designated β1, β2 and β3 receptors. β1-adrenergic receptors are located mainly in the heart and in the kidneys. β2-adrenergic receptors are located mainly in the lungs, gastrointestinal tract, liver, uterus, vascular smooth muscle, and skeletal muscle. β3-adrenergic receptors are located in fat cells.

Beta receptors are found on cells of the heart muscles, smooth muscles, airways, arteries, kidneys, and other tissues that are part of the sympathetic nervous system and lead to stress responses, especially when they are stimulated by epinephrine (adrenaline). Beta blockers interfere with the binding to the receptor of epinephrine and other stress hormones and weaken the effects of stress hormones.

In 1964, James Black synthesized the first clinically significant beta blockers—propranolol and pronethalol; it revolutionized the medical management of angina pectoris and is considered by many to be one of the most important contributions to clinical medicine and pharmacology of the 20th century.

For the treatment of primary hypertension, meta-analyses of studies which mostly used atenolol have shown that although beta blockers are more effective than placebo in preventing stroke and total cardiovascular events, they are not as effective as diuretics, medications inhibiting the renin–angiotensin system (e.g., ACE inhibitors), or calcium channel blockers.

Medical uses 
Large differences exist in the pharmacology of agents within the class, thus not all beta blockers are used for all indications listed below.

Indications for beta blockers include:
 Angina pectoris (contraindicated for Prinzmetal's angina)
 Atrial fibrillation
 Cardiac arrhythmia
 Congestive heart failure
 Essential tremor
 Glaucoma (as eye drops, they decrease intraocular pressure by lowering aqueous humor secretion)
 Hypertension, although they are generally not preferred as an initial treatment
 Hyperthyroidism
 Migraine prophylaxis
 Mitral valve prolapse
 Myocardial infarction
 Phaeochromocytoma, in conjunction with α-blocker
 Postural orthostatic tachycardia syndrome
 Symptomatic control (tachycardia, tremor) in anxiety and hyperthyroidism
 Theophylline overdose

Beta blockers have also been used for:
 Acute aortic dissection
 Hypertrophic obstructive cardiomyopathy
 Long QT syndrome
 Marfan syndrome (treatment with propranolol slows progression of aortic dilation and its complications)
 Prevention of variceal bleeding in portal hypertension
 Possible mitigation of hyperhidrosis
 Social and other anxiety disorders
 Controversially, for reduction of perioperative mortality in non-cardiac surgery, but the best evidence suggests that they increase mortality when used this way

Congestive heart failure
Although beta blockers were once contraindicated in congestive heart failure, as they have the potential to worsen the condition due to their effect of decreasing cardiac contractility, studies in the late 1990s showed their efficacy at reducing morbidity and mortality.
Bisoprolol, carvedilol, and sustained-release metoprolol are specifically indicated as adjuncts to standard ACE inhibitor and diuretic therapy in congestive heart failure, although at doses typically much lower than those indicated for other conditions. Beta blockers are only indicated in cases of compensated, stable congestive heart failure; in cases of acute decompensated heart failure, beta blockers will cause a further decrease in ejection fraction, worsening the patient's current symptoms.

Beta blockers are known primarily for their reductive effect on heart rate, although this is not the only mechanism of action of importance in congestive heart failure. Beta blockers, in addition to their sympatholytic β1 activity in the heart, influence the renin–angiotensin system at the kidneys. Beta blockers cause a decrease in renin secretion, which in turn reduces the heart oxygen demand by lowering the extracellular volume and increasing the oxygen-carrying capacity of the blood. Heart failure characteristically involves increased catecholamine activity on the heart, which is responsible for several deleterious effects, including increased oxygen demand, propagation of inflammatory mediators, and abnormal cardiac tissue remodeling, all of which decrease the efficiency of cardiac contraction and contribute to the low ejection fraction. Beta blockers counter this inappropriately high sympathetic activity, eventually leading to an improved ejection fraction, despite an initial reduction in ejection fraction.

Trials have shown beta blockers reduce the absolute risk of death by 4.5% over a 13-month period. In addition to reducing the risk of mortality, the numbers of hospital visits and hospitalizations were also reduced in the trials.

Therapeutic administration of beta blockers for congestive heart failure ought to begin at very low doses (1/8 of target) with a gradual escalation of the dose. The heart of the patient must adjust to decreasing stimulation by catecholamines and find a new equilibrium at a lower adrenergic drive.

Anxiety
Officially, beta blockers are not approved for anxiolytic use by the U.S. Food and Drug Administration. However, many controlled trials in the past 25 years indicate beta blockers are effective in anxiety disorders, though the mechanism of action is not known. The physiological symptoms of the fight-or-flight response (pounding heart, cold/clammy hands, increased respiration, sweating, etc.) are significantly reduced, thus enabling anxious individuals to concentrate on the task at hand.

Musicians, public speakers, actors, and professional dancers have been known to use beta blockers to avoid performance anxiety, stage fright, and tremor during both auditions and public performances. The application to stage fright was first recognized in The Lancet in 1976, and by 1987, a survey conducted by the International Conference of Symphony Orchestra Musicians, representing the 51 largest orchestras in the United States, revealed 27% of its musicians had used beta blockers and 70% obtained them from friends, not physicians. Beta blockers are inexpensive, said to be relatively safe, and on one hand, seem to improve musicians' performances on a technical level, while some, such as Barry Green, the author of "The Inner Game of Music" and Don Greene, a former Olympic diving coach who teaches Juilliard students to overcome their stage fright naturally, say the performances may be perceived as "soulless and inauthentic".

Surgery
Low certainty evidence indicates that the use of beta blockers around the time of cardiac surgery may decrease the risk of heart dysrhythmias and atrial fibrillation. Starting them around the time of other types of surgery, however, may worsen outcomes. For non-cardiac surgery, the use of beta blockers to prevent adverse effects may reduce the risk of atrial fibrillation and myocardial infarctions (very low certainty evidence), however, there is moderate certainty evidence that this approach may increase the risk of hypotension. Low-certainty evidence suggests that beta blockers used perioperatively in non-cardiac surgeries may increase the risk of bradycardia.

Performance-enhancing use
Because they promote lower heart rates and reduce tremors, beta blockers have been used in professional sports where high accuracy is required, including archery, shooting, golf and snooker. Beta blockers are banned in some sports by the International Olympic Committee. In the 2008 Summer Olympics, 50-metre pistol silver medalist and 10-metre air pistol bronze medalist Kim Jong-su tested positive for propranolol and was stripped of his medals.

For similar reasons, beta blockers have also been used by surgeons.

Classical musicians have commonly used beta blockers since the 1970s to reduce stage fright.

Adverse effects 
Adverse drug reactions  associated with the use of beta blockers include: nausea, diarrhea, bronchospasm, dyspnea, cold extremities, exacerbation of Raynaud's syndrome, bradycardia, hypotension, heart failure, heart block, fatigue, dizziness, alopecia (hair loss), abnormal vision, hallucinations, insomnia, nightmares, sexual dysfunction, erectile dysfunction and/or alteration of glucose and lipid metabolism. Mixed α1/β-antagonist therapy is also commonly associated with orthostatic hypotension. Carvedilol therapy is commonly associated with edema. Due to the high penetration across the blood–brain barrier, lipophilic beta blockers, such as propranolol and metoprolol, are more likely than other less lipophilic beta blockers to cause sleep disturbances, such as insomnia, vivid dreams and nightmares.

Adverse effects associated with β2-adrenergic receptor antagonist activity (bronchospasm, peripheral vasoconstriction, alteration of glucose and lipid metabolism) are less common with β1-selective (often termed "cardioselective") agents, but receptor selectivity diminishes at higher doses. Beta blockade, especially of the beta-1 receptor at the macula densa, inhibits renin release, thus decreasing the release of aldosterone. This causes hyponatremia and hyperkalemia.

Hypoglycemia can occur with beta blockade because β2-adrenoceptors normally stimulate glycogen breakdown (glycogenolysis) in the liver and pancreatic release of the hormone glucagon, which work together to increase plasma glucose. Therefore, blocking β2-adrenoceptors lowers plasma glucose. β1-blockers have fewer metabolic side effects in diabetic patients; however, the fast heart rate that serves as a warning sign for insulin-induced low blood sugar may be masked, resulting in hypoglycemia unawareness. This is termed beta blocker-induced hypoglycemia unawareness. Therefore, beta blockers are to be used cautiously in diabetics.

A 2007 study revealed diuretics and beta blockers used for hypertension increase a patient's risk of developing diabetes mellitus, while ACE inhibitors and angiotensin II receptor antagonists (angiotensin receptor blockers) actually decrease the risk of diabetes. Clinical guidelines in Great Britain, but not in the United States, call for avoiding diuretics and beta blockers as first-line treatment of hypertension due to the risk of diabetes.

Beta blockers must not be used in the treatment of selective alpha-adrenergic agonist overdose. The blockade of only beta receptors increases blood pressure, reduces coronary blood flow, left ventricular function, and cardiac output and tissue perfusion by means of leaving the alpha-adrenergic system stimulation unopposed. Beta blockers with lipophilic properties and CNS penetration such as metoprolol and labetalol may be useful for treating CNS and cardiovascular toxicity from a methamphetamine overdose. The mixed alpha- and beta blocker labetalol is especially useful for treatment of concomitant tachycardia and hypertension induced by methamphetamine. The phenomenon of "unopposed alpha stimulation" has not been reported with the use of beta blockers for treatment of methamphetamine toxicity. Other appropriate antihypertensive drugs to administer during hypertensive crisis resulting from stimulant overdose are vasodilators such as nitroglycerin, diuretics such as furosemide, and alpha blockers such as phentolamine.

Contraindications

Contraindications for beta blockers include:

 Abrupt discontinuations
 Acute bronchospasm
 Acute heart failure
 Asthma
 AV block
 Bradycardia
 Bronchitis
 Cardiogenic shock
 Cerebrovascular disease
 Chronic obstructive pulmonary disease (COPD)
 Diabetes mellitus
 Emphysema
 Hypersensitivity to beta blockers
 Hypotension
 Kidney failure
 Hepatic disease
 Myopathy
 Pheochromocytoma
 Psoriasis
 Stroke
 Vasospastic angina
 Wolff–Parkinson–White syndrome

Asthma
The 2007 National Heart, Lung, and Blood Institute (NHLBI) asthma guidelines recommend against the use of non-selective beta blockers in asthmatics, while allowing for the use of cardio selective beta blockers.

Cardio selective beta blocker (β1 blockers), if really required, can be prescribed at the least possible dose to those with mild to moderate respiratory symptoms. β2-agonists can somewhat mitigate β-Blocker-induced bronchospasm where it exerts greater efficacy on reversing selective β-blocker-induced bronchospasm than the nonselective β-blocker-induced worsening asthma and/or COPD.

Diabetes mellitus 
Epinephrine signals early warning of the upcoming hypoglycemia.

Beta blockers' inhibition on epinephrine's effect can somewhat exacerbate hypoglycemia by interfering with glycogenolysis and mask signs of hypoglycemia such as tachycardia, palpitations, diaphoresis, and tremors. Diligent blood glucose level monitoring is necessary for a patient with diabetes mellitus on beta blocker.

Hyperthyroidism 
Abrupt withdrawal can result in a thyroid storm.

Bradycardia or AV block 
Unless a pacemaker is present, beta blockers can severely depress conduction in the AV node, resulting in a reduction of heart rate and cardiac output. One should be very cautious with the use of beta blockers in tachycardia patients with Wolff-Parkinson-White Syndrome, as it can result in life-threatening arrhythmia in certain patients. By slowing the conduction through the AV node, preferential conduction through the accessory pathway is favored. If the patient happens to develop atrial flutter, this could lead to a 1:1 conduction with very fast ventricular rate, or worse, ventricular fibrillation in the case of atrial fibrillation.

Toxicity
Glucagon, used in the treatment of overdose, increases the strength of heart contractions, increases intracellular cAMP, and decreases renal vascular resistance. It is, therefore, useful in patients with beta blocker cardiotoxicity. Cardiac pacing is usually reserved for patients unresponsive to pharmacological therapy.

People experiencing bronchospasm due to the β2 receptor-blocking effects of nonselective beta blockers may be treated with anticholinergic drugs, such as ipratropium, which are safer than beta agonists in patients with cardiovascular disease. Other antidotes for beta blocker poisoning are salbutamol and isoprenaline.

β-receptor antagonism

Stimulation of β1 receptors by epinephrine and norepinephrine induces a positive chronotropic and inotropic effect on the heart and increases cardiac conduction velocity and automaticity. Stimulation of β1 receptors on the kidney causes renin release. Stimulation of β2 receptors induces smooth muscle relaxation, induces tremor in skeletal muscle, and increases glycogenolysis in the liver and skeletal muscle. Stimulation of β3 receptors induces lipolysis.

Beta blockers inhibit these normal epinephrine- and norepinephrine-mediated sympathetic actions, but have minimal effect on resting subjects.
That is, they reduce the effect of excitement or physical exertion on heart rate and force of contraction, and also tremor, and breakdown of glycogen. Beta blockers can have a constricting effect on the bronchi of the lungs, possibly worsening or causing asthma symptoms.

Since β2 adrenergic receptors can cause vascular smooth muscle dilation, beta blockers may cause some vasoconstriction. However, this effect tends to be small because the activity of β2 receptors is overshadowed by the more dominant vasoconstricting α1 receptors. By far the greatest effect of beta blockers remains in the heart. Newer, third-generation beta blockers can cause vasodilation through blockade of alpha-adrenergic receptors.

Accordingly, nonselective beta blockers are expected to have antihypertensive effects. The primary antihypertensive mechanism of beta blockers is unclear, but may involve reduction in cardiac output (due to negative chronotropic and inotropic effects). It may also be due to reduction in renin release from the kidneys, and a central nervous system effect to reduce sympathetic activity (for those beta blockers that do cross the blood–brain barrier, e.g. propranolol).

Antianginal effects result from negative chronotropic and inotropic effects, which decrease cardiac workload and oxygen demand. Negative chronotropic properties of beta blockers allow the lifesaving property of heart rate control. Beta blockers are readily titrated to optimal rate control in many pathologic states.

The antiarrhythmic effects of beta blockers arise from sympathetic nervous system blockade—resulting in depression of sinus node function and atrioventricular node conduction, and prolonged atrial refractory periods. Sotalol, in particular, has additional antiarrhythmic properties and prolongs action potential duration through potassium channel blockade.

Blockade of the sympathetic nervous system on renin release leads to reduced aldosterone via the renin–angiotensin–aldosterone system, with a resultant decrease in blood pressure due to decreased sodium and water retention.

Intrinsic sympathomimetic activity

Also referred to as intrinsic sympathomimetic effect, this term is used particularly with beta blockers that can show both agonism and antagonism at a given beta receptor, depending on the concentration of the agent (beta blocker) and the concentration of the antagonized agent (usually an endogenous compound, such as norepinephrine). See partial agonist for a more general description.

Some beta blockers (e.g. oxprenolol, pindolol, penbutolol, labetalol and acebutolol) exhibit intrinsic sympathomimetic activity (ISA). These agents are capable of exerting low-level agonist activity at the β-adrenergic receptor while simultaneously acting as a receptor site antagonist. These agents, therefore, may be useful in individuals exhibiting excessive bradycardia with sustained beta blocker therapy.

Agents with ISA should not be used for patients with any kind of angina as it can aggravate or after myocardial infarctions. They may also be less effective than other beta blockers in the management of angina and tachyarrhythmia.

α1-receptor antagonism

Some beta blockers (e.g., labetalol and carvedilol) exhibit mixed antagonism of both β- and α1-adrenergic receptors, which provides additional arteriolar vasodilating action.

Examples

Nonselective agents
Nonselective beta blockers display both β1 and β2 antagonism.
 Propranolol
 Bucindolol (has additional α1-blocking activity)
 Carteolol
 Carvedilol (has additional α1-blocking activity)
 Labetalol (has intrinsic sympathomimetic activity and additional α1-blocking activity)
 Nadolol
 Oxprenolol (has intrinsic sympathomimetic activity)
 Penbutolol (has intrinsic sympathomimetic activity)
 Pindolol (has intrinsic sympathomimetic activity)
 Sotalol (not considered a "typical beta blocker")
 Timolol

β1-selective agents
β1-selective beta blockers are also known as cardioselective beta blockers. Pharmacologically, the beta-blockade of the B1 receptors in the heart will act on cAMP. The function of cAMP as a second messenger in the cardiac cell is that it phosphorylates the LTCC and the ryanodine receptor to increase intracellular calcium levels and cause contraction. Beta-blockade of the B1 receptor will inhibit cAMP from phosphorylating, and it will decrease the ionotrophic and chronotropic effect. Note that drugs may be cardioselective, or act on B1 receptors in the heart only, but still have instrinsic sympathomimetic activity. 
 Acebutolol (has intrinsic sympathomimetic activity, ISA)
 Atenolol
 Betaxolol
 Bisoprolol
 Celiprolol (has intrinsic sympathomimetic activity)
 Metoprolol
 Nebivolol
 Esmolol
Nebivolol and Bisoprolol are the most β1 cardioselective beta blockers.

β2-selective agents
 Butaxamine
 ICI-118,551

β3-selective agents
 SR 59230A

β1 selective antagonist and β3 agonist agents 
 Nebivolol

Comparative information

Pharmacological differences
 Agents with intrinsic sympathomimetic action (ISA)
 Acebutolol, pindolol, labetalol, mepindolol, oxprenolol, celiprolol, penbutolol
 Agents organized by lipid solubility (lipophilicity)
 High lipophilicity: propranolol, labetalol
 Intermediate lipophilicity: metoprolol, bisoprolol, carvedilol, acebutolol, timolol, pindolol
 Low lipophilicity (also known as hydrophilic beta blockers): atenolol, nadolol, and sotalol
 Agents with membrane stabilizing effect
 Carvedilol, propranolol > oxprenolol > labetalol, metoprolol, timolol

Indication differences
 Agents specifically labeled for cardiac arrhythmia
 Esmolol, sotalol, landiolol (Japan)
 Agents specifically labeled for congestive heart failure
 Bisoprolol, carvedilol, sustained-release metoprolol
 Agents specifically labeled for glaucoma
 Betaxolol, carteolol, levobunolol, timolol, metipranolol
 Agents specifically labeled for myocardial infarction
 Atenolol, metoprolol (immediate release), propranolol (immediate release), timolol, carvedilol (after left ventricular dysfunction), bisoprolol (preventive treatment before and primary treatment after heart attacks)
 Agents specifically labeled for migraine prophylaxis
 Timolol, propranolol

Propranolol is the only agent indicated for the control of tremor, portal hypertension, and esophageal variceal bleeding, and used in conjunction with α-blocker therapy in phaeochromocytoma.

Other effects

Beta blockers, due to their antagonism at beta-1 adrenergic receptors, inhibit both the synthesis of new melatonin and its secretion by the pineal gland. The neuropsychiatric side effects of some beta blockers (e.g. sleep disruption, insomnia) may be due to this effect.

Some pre-clinical and clinical research suggests that some beta blockers may be beneficial for cancer treatment. However, other studies do not show a correlation between cancer survival and beta blocker usage. Also, a 2017 meta-analysis failed to show any benefit for the use of beta blockers in breast cancer.

Beta blockers have also been used for the treatment of schizoid personality disorder. However, there is limited evidence supporting the efficacy of supplemental beta blocker use in addition to antipsychotic drugs for treating schizophrenia.

Contrast agents are not contraindicated in those receiving beta blockers.

See also 
 Alpha blockers

References

External links 
 Musicians and beta-blockers by Gerald Klickstein, March 11, 2010 (A blog post that considers "whether beta-blockers are safe, effective, and appropriate for performers to use.")
 Better Playing Through Chemistry by Blair Tindall, The New York Times, October 17, 2004. (Discusses the use of beta blockers among professional musicians)
 Musicians using beta blockers by Blair Tindall. A condensed version of the above article.
 In Defense of the Beta Blocker by Carl Elliott, The Atlantic, August 20, 2008. (Discusses the use of propranolol by a North Korean pistol shooter in the 2008 Olympics)
 

 
Scottish inventions